The National Catholic Youth Conference, frequently referred to as NCYC, is a three-day event for Roman Catholic youth. NCYC is held in U.S. cities every two years and organized in part by the host diocese of the city. The conference is organized by the National Federation for Catholic Youth Ministry (NFCYM). During the conference, there is music, prayer, workshops, liturgy, and opportunities to participate in the Sacrament of Penance, otherwise known as Reconciliation or Confession. 

There are also concerts, dances, and a comedy club at NCYC. An area, known as the "thematic park", is set up with interactive educational and recreational activities, as well as traditional exhibits and vendor booths.

The nature of the NCYC conference requires large indoor facilities for a conference. The Nationwide Arena was used in conjunction with the Columbus Convention Center at the 2007 NCYC, where the 20,000 seat arena space was used for general sessions and participants walked to the convention center for breakout sessions including workshops and larger concurrent sessions. At the 2009 conference, the general session was duplicated via live video stream to the Grand Ballroom of the Kansas City Convention Center for overflow purposes. There were over 5,000 in overflow seating as the Sprint Center seated only 19,000. NCYC does not use club-level seats in participating arenas, lowering the optimum seating capacity, but floor seats are available on a first come, first served basis.

The 2011 NCYC was held at Lucas Oil Stadium in Indianapolis. The event's main sessions were broadcast around the world online. During the day, the participants spent the day in the Indiana Convention Center for small workshops and influential speakers. The city of Indianapolis has since hosted the 2013, 2015, and 2017 conferences. Christian artist Matt Maher made an appearance at the 2013 conference.

At the 2019 NCYC, also held at Lucas Oil Stadium, Pope Francis addressed the conference with a prerecorded video message. This is the first time that a sitting pope has addressed NCYC. The popular Christian band for KING & COUNTRY also put on a performance as well at the beginning of the conference

History 

NCYC began in 1983 as a regional conference, with one session for the east coast and one session for the west coast. The regional conferences had a few thousand youth in attendance.  NCYC was merged into a national conference in 1991 and interest in the conference began to grow. The conference now attracts over 20,000 youth and adults for three days of worship, music, and fun.

*Indicates "in-person" attendance due to COVID-19 restrictions

References

External links 
Official Website
NCYC Background Information

Youth conferences